Peter Mintun (born 1950) is a pianist and historian of American music of the 1920s.

Biography 

Wikipedia Biography

Biography 

Mintun was born in 1950 into a musical family in Berkeley, California, and grew up playing at parties and local events, and was drawn to American music of the 1920s, 1930s, and 1940s at an early age.

From 1973 to 1989, Mintun played regularly at the San Francisco restaurant L’Etoile and after that, at the Fairmont San Francisco.  He began playing in New York City and played first at the New York Palace, then seven years at Bemelmans Bar at the Carlyle Hotel; he moved to New York City in 2001.

Mintun has released three of his own recordings of songs of the ‘20s and ‘30s: “Deep Purple,” “Grand Piano,” and “Piano at the Paramount,” which were called "exemplars of re-creations of music of that era."  He has also produced piano rolls of his performances. He has appeared in motion pictures, television, concert halls.

He is an authority on the composer Dana Suesse and has championed her music. He has been a consultant for numerous books on “jazz age” music.
Upon buying an 1897 townhouse in Washington Heights, Manhattan, became an informal neighborhood historian as well.

References

External links
Peter Mintun, Pianist - Home Page
 Peter Mintun YouTube Channel: "Min-Tube"

Living people
1950 births
People from Berkeley, California
20th-century American pianists
American male pianists
21st-century American pianists
20th-century American male musicians
21st-century American male musicians
American jazz pianists
Jazz musicians from California